Fleury is a commune in the Manche department in north-western France.

Notable residents
Michael Vartan

Gallery

See also
Communes of the Manche department

References

Communes of Manche